Manchester United Football Club is an English professional football club based in Old Trafford, Greater Manchester. The club was formed in Newton Heath in 1878 as Newton Heath LYR F.C., and played their first competitive match in October 1886, when they entered the First Round of the 1886–87 FA Cup. The club was renamed Manchester United F.C. in 1902, and moved to Old Trafford in 1910.

The club has won a total of 66 major trophies: the League Championship a record twenty times (seven times in the Football League era and a record thirteen times in the Premier League era), the FA Cup twelve times, the League Cup five times, the Community Shield a record 21 times (including four shared titles), the European Cup three times, the UEFA Europa League once, the European Cup Winners' Cup once, the European Super Cup once, the Intercontinental Cup once and the FIFA Club World Cup once. The club has also never been out of the top two divisions of English football since entering the Football League. As of the end of the 2021–22 season, the club has played a total of 5,827 competitive matches, and has competed in the top flight for 97 of their 123 seasons.

This list details the club's achievements in major competitions, and the top scorers for each season. Top scorers in bold were also the top scorers in the English league that season. Records of competitions such as the Lancashire Cup and the Manchester and District Challenge Cup are not included due to them being considered of less importance than the FA Cup and the League Cup.

History
The club formed in 1878 as Newton Heath LYR F.C. At this time organised League football did not exist; "first class matches" were arranged on a largely ad-hoc basis and supplemented by cup competitions. Official records from these matches are sketchy at best, and are often extrapolated from newspaper reports at the time. In 1886, the club entered the FA Cup for the first time, but were knocked out in the first round. They entered The Combination in 1888, but the league was wound up before the season could be completed. The club then joined the Football Alliance in 1889, and in 1892 were elected to the newly formed Football League First Division. Upon joining the Football League, the club dropped the "LYR" from their name, before financial troubles forced the club to restructure in 1902, including a change of name to Manchester United F.C.

In 1956–57, Manchester United became the first English club to enter European competition, entering the European Cup, following the Football Association's refusal to allow Chelsea to enter the previous year. Eleven years later, in 1968, they became the first English club to win the European Cup, and only the second British side after Celtic had won it the year before. Meanwhile, in 1960–61, Manchester United entered the inaugural Football League Cup, only to decline to enter for the next five years. In 1992–93, they became founder members and inaugural champions of the Premier League, and, in 1998–99, they won an unprecedented Treble of the Premier League, FA Cup and UEFA Champions League. This was followed by two more Premier League titles in 1999–2000 and 2000–01, making Manchester United only the fourth club to win three consecutive English league titles. The club picked up their 10th Premier League title in the 2007–08 season, and followed it with a third Champions League title 10 days later. The following season, Manchester United became the first British club to win the FIFA Club World Cup, before becoming the first English club to claim three consecutive league titles twice. In 2010–11, Manchester United won their 19th top division title, passing Liverpool's previous record of 18, before winning a 20th title in 2012–13. In 2016–17, Manchester United won their first UEFA Europa League trophy, making them only the fifth club to win the three main European club competitions.

Key

 Pld = Matches played
 W = Matches won
 D = Matches drawn
 L = Matches lost
 GF = Goals for
 GA = Goals against
 Pts = Points
 Pos = Final position

 Alliance = Football Alliance
 Combination = The Combination
 Div 1 = Football League First Division
 Div 2 = Football League Second Division
 Prem = Premier League

 F = Final
 Group = Group stage
 QF = Quarter-finals
 QR1 = First qualifying round
 QR2 = Second qualifying round
 QR3 = Third qualifying round
 QR4 = Fourth qualifying round
 RInt = Intermediate round

 R1 = Round 1
 R2 = Round 2
 R3 = Round 3
 R4 = Round 4
 R5 = Round 5
 R6 = Round 6
 SF = Semi-finals

Seasons

Notes

References
General

Specific

 
Seasons
Manchester United